The 2016 Weymouth and Portland Borough Council election took place on 5 May 2016 to elect members of Weymouth and Portland Borough Council in England. This was on the same day as other local elections.

This result had the following consequences for the total number of seats on the council after the elections:

Ward results

Littlemoor

Melcombe Regis

Melcombe Regis was won by the Conservative Party in 2012 but taken by the Labour Party in a By-Election on 16 May 2013.

Preston

Radipole

Tophill West

Underhill

Westham East

Westham North

Westham West

Weymouth East

Weymouth West

Wyke Regis

Craig Martin (Labour Party) was elected in 2014 but stood down. As a result, there was an election for two councillors, one to serve from 2016 to 2020 and one to serve from 2016 to 2018.

References

2016 English local elections
2016
2010s in Dorset